The 28th British Academy Scotland Awards was held on 4 November 2018 at the Radisson Blu Hotel in Glasgow, honouring the best Scottish film and television productions of 2017. The nominations were announced by Edith Bowman on 26 September 2018.

Winners and nominees

Winners are listed first and highlighted in boldface.

Outstanding Contribution to Film & Television
Alan Cumming

Outstanding Contribution to Craft
Pat Campbell

Outstanding Contribution to the Scottish Industry
Paddy Higson

See also
71st British Academy Film Awards
90th Academy Awards
24th Screen Actors Guild Awards

References

External links
BAFTA Scotland Home page

2018
2018 in British cinema
British Academy Scotland Awards
British Academy Scotland Awards
2018 in Scotland
2018 in British television
Brit
November 2018 events in the United Kingdom
2010s in Glasgow